Beaver Water District (BWD) is a water district created in 1957 as a quasi-governmental agency to provide treated drinking water to the communities of Northwest Arkansas. The district's source is Beaver Lake, an impoundment of the White River created by Beaver Dam. The district wholesales treated potable water to Bentonville, Fayetteville, Rogers and Springdale, who then re-sell the water to their residential/commercial customers and smaller nearby communities.

Administration
Beaver Water District is governed by its board of directors. The elected six-member board contains three members each from Benton and Washington counties. The board meets monthly at the district's office in Lowell.

Customers
BWD sells water wholesale to the four largest communities in NWA, who utilize their own distribution systems to deliver water to residential and commercial customers. All four communities also resell to smaller communities within their service area that utilize distribution systems under their jurisdiction. For example, Springdale Water Utilities owns and maintains water mains in Johnson.
Bentonville
Bella Vista
Cave Springs
Fayetteville
Elkins
Farmington
Goshen
Greenland
Mount Olive Rural Water Association
Wheeler
Johnson (south)
Rural Washington County
West Fork
Springdale
Bethel Heights
Elm Springs
Johnson (north)
Lowell (south)
Rural Benton and Washington counties
Tontitown
Rogers
Lowell (north)
Benton County Rural Development Authority (RDA) No. 4 Frisco Springs.
Madison County Rural Water District

Controversy
In 2003, residents near Monte Ne filed a complaint with the Arkansas Department of Environmental Quality (ADEQ) that alleged BWD was polluting the bay with untreated process water from filter backwashing. ADEQ concluded that aluminum levels were elevated and could be toxic to aquatic biota, but was not toxic to humans. Soil samples indicated elevated levels of arsenic, barium, cadmium, chromium, lead, and mercury. BWD was ordered to pay a $9,000 fine for eight violations of its NPDES permit under the Clean Water Act.

See also
 
 
 List of public utilities in Arkansas

References

Benton County, Arkansas
Washington County, Arkansas
Water companies of the United States